The bilateral relations of the Philippines and Ukraine began with a formal agreement in 1992. Neither country has a resident ambassador. Ukraine has a non-resident ambassador in Kuala Lumpur, Malaysia. The Philippines is represented by its embassy in Warsaw, Poland.

History
The Philippines recognized Ukraine's independence on January 22, 1992 and formal relations began on April 7, 1992. Until June 1993,  bilateral relations were maintained through the Philippine embassy in Poland. Prior to December 2004, Ukraine maintained relations with the Philippines through its embassies in Indonesia and Vietnam.

Since 1993, the Philippine embassy in Moscow handles bilateral relations with Ukraine, but has since moved to the Philippine embassy in Warsaw. Since December 2004, Ukraine maintained its relations with the Philippines through its embassy in Tokyo, but has since moved it to its ambassador in Kuala Lumpur.

In April 1997 a Ukrainian parliamentary delegation to Manila signed an interparliamentary cooperation agreement. In July 2003 Philippine Vice-President Teofisto Guingona met Ukrainian Foreign Minister Anatoliy Zlenko in Manila.  At the meeting, they signed a protocol on political cooperation. In June 2005,  Speaker José de Venecia, Jr led a House delegation to Ukraine, and met with Ukrainian President Victor Yushchenko and a range of other top officials. They discussed Christian-Muslim interfaith dialogue, the development of two energy plants in the Philippines by the Ukrainian company Sukhin Energy Incorporated, and a debt conversion initiative.

As of June 2019, there are 342 Overseas Filipinos in Ukraine, and the Philippine government has been actively attending to them and promoting the country's interests through the Honorary Consulate in Kyiv. As of March 2020, around 200 Ukrainians are residing in the Philippines.

Amidst the 2022 Russian invasion of Ukraine, the Department of Foreign Affairs raised Alert Level 4, signifying the mandatory evacuation of all Filipino nationals from Ukraine. The Philippines evacuated 342 of its nationals  by March 2022. Philippine President Bongbong Marcos has said: "“I don’t think there is a need to make a stand. We are not involved, except for our nationals.” The Philippines voted in favor of the United Nations resolution condemning the Russian invasion. In November 2022, during the APEC summit in Thailand, President Marcos has said that the war is "unacceptable" and has urged peace between the two nations.

Ukraine seeks to establish an embassy in the Philippines,but budgetary constraints have delayed this endeavor. On the other hand, in June 2022, Foreign Affairs Secretary Teodoro Locsin Jr. said that the Philippines seeks to establish an embassy in Ukraine. However, as of January 2023, the Philippines has not made any requests to establish an embassy in Kyiv.

Agreements
The Philippines and Ukraine have seven bilateral agreements in place: 
An exchange of letters between the Ministry of Foreign Affairs of Ukraine and the Department of Foreign Affairs of the Philippines (entered into force 7 April 1992).
A memorandum on cooperation between the Verkhovna Rada and the Philippine House of Representatives (14 April 1997).
A protocol on political consultations between their respective Foreign Affairs bodies (14 July 2003).
A memorandum between the State Committee of Financial Monitoring of Ukraine and the Financial Surveillance Body of the Philippines to exchange the financial information regarding money laundering (12 March 2008).
An agreement between the Council of Ministers of Crimea and the Government of Cebu Province about trade, economic, scientific, technical and cultural cooperation (26 November 2010). 
A memorandum on cooperation between the Diplomatic Academy of Ukraine and the Foreign Service Institute of the Philippines (6 December 2010).

Economic relations
Bilateral trade between Ukraine and the Philippines amounted to $20.21 million in a six-month period in 2012. The Philippine negative trade balance for the same period amounted to $15.59 million. Among Ukraine's main export to the Philippines during the period are feed wheat,  coloring materials, machinery for metal stamping, forging, bending, alignment, cutting, press, whey, ammonia.

The Philippines imports from Ukraine during the same six month in 2012 amounted to $17.90 million. Among the Philippines main import from Ukraine are electrical products, electronic integrated circuits and electronic micro modules. Among the Philippines main export to Ukraine are bells, gongs, statuettes, frames and mirrors, of base metal, printing equipment, printing machines, auxiliary machine for printing, automatic data processing machines and units thereof and parts, raw tobacco, tobacco.

See also
 Foreign relations of the Philippines
 Foreign relations of Ukraine

References

Ukraine
Bilateral relations of Ukraine